Aignay-le-Duc is a commune in the Côte-d'Or department in the Bourgogne-Franche-Comté region of eastern France.

The inhabitants of the commune are known as Aignacois or Aignacoises.

Geography
The commune of Aignay-le-Duc is located some 30 km south-east of Châtillon-sur-Seine and some 30 km east of Montbard in a direct line. Access to the commune is by Highway D901 which enters on the north-west border, continues to the village and exits the south-east border. There is also Highway D101 linking the village to Étalante to the south-east.  Highway D954 links the village through the eastern border to Saint-Broing-les-Moines.  There is also Highway D112 which exits the commune in the north-east.  There are extensive forests in the eastern part of the commune (Bois de Fort Fais, Bois du Bas des Soulers etc.) with about two thirds of the commune farmland. There are no villages other than Aignay-le-Duc.

The Coquille stream flows through the town and forming the eastern border is the Brevon stream.  The Coquille flows to the Revinson stream which joins the Seine river.  The Brevon flows north and eventually joins the Seine near Brémur-et-Vaurois.

Neighbouring Communes and Villages

History
Aignay-le-Duc belonged to the territory of Lingons and had a Celtic population. Its name may come from the Celtic: Ann-iacum meaning "The location of the water source" ann- is a well known root name for rivers [e.g. l'Ain, Inn (Austria), Anio (Italy)]. The village is close to the source of the Coquille.

A yellow limestone used in the cemetery, dating from the late second century or early third century AD, is inscribed: Aug (ustis) sac (rum) deo Marti Cicolluis et Litavi P. Attius Paterc[l]u[s] [v(otum) s(olvit) l(ibens) m(erito)] which means:
"To the august sacred deities, to the god Mars Cicolluis and Litavi, P. Attius Paterculus paid his vow willingly and deservedly".

An inscription was found on a bronze vase near Aignay in 1896 which, according to Chassenay, said: Aug(usto) sacr(um) deo Albio et Damonae Sext(us) Mart(ius) Cociliani f(ilius) ex jussu ejus [v(otum)] s(olvit) l(ibens) m(erito) meaning "It is sacred to Augustus, to the gods Albius and Damona, Sextus Martius, son of Cocilianus, in order to fulfill his vow.

During the revolutionary period of the National Convention (1792-1795), the town took the name of Aignay-Côte-d'Or abbreviated to Aignay.

Heraldry

Administration

List of Successive Mayors of Aignay-le-Duc

Population

Culture and heritage

Civil heritage
The commune has a large number of Houses that are registered as historical monuments.

The commune also has many other buildings and structures that are registered as historical monuments:
A Lavoir (Public laundry) at Rue de la Demoiselle (19th century)
A Fountain at Rue de la Planchotte (18th century)
A Barn at Rue de l'Ile (1790)
A Bridge at Rue de l'Ile (19th century)
The Lavoir de la Margelle (Public laundry) at Rue de la Margelle (18th century)
A Railway worker refuge at RN 454 (19th century)
A Lavoir (Public laundry) at Rue des Vieilles Halles (19th century)
A Farmhouse at Grand Bois (17th century)
The Pierre-Fiche Menhir (Prehistoric)
A Commemorative Monument at Combe des Carrés (1839)
The Covered Market (18th century)
The Town Hall / School (1789)
The Urban Area Fortification (15th century)

Other sites of interest
Celtic Tumuli have been found including several burials from different periods, the most recent dating to the 5th century AD.

Religious heritage

The commune has several religious buildings and structures that are registered as historical monuments:
A Wayside Cross at Chemin de Beaunotte (1831)
A Wayside Cross at Chevigny Farm (17th century)
A Wayside Cross at Rue des Granges (1674)
The Croix Lannier Wayside Cross north of the village (1662)
The ''Croix Mignard'' Wayside Cross north-east of the village (17th century)
A Presbytery (19th century). The Presbytery contains several items that are registered as historical objects:
The Furniture in the Presbytery
A Processional Staff (18th century)
A Statue: Virgin and child (2) (19th century)
A Statue: Virgin and child (1) (17th century)
A Statue: Saint Eloi (17th century)
A Wayside Cross at Grand Bois (16th century)
A Monumental Cross at Saint-Michel (1637)
A Tomb (19th century)
A Cemetery Cross (1637)
The Cemetery Portal (19th century)
The Church of Saint Peter and Saint Paul (1170). The Church contains a very large number of items which are registered as historical objects.

Notable People linked to the Commune
Nicolas Frochot, an influential provost of Aignay-le-Duc, he ended his career as a State Councilor and first Prefect of the Seine under Napoleon I.
Claude-Auguste Petit, Baron of Beauverger (born Aignay-le-Duc, 7 October 1748 - died Paris, 6 September 1819), brother of the Nicholas Frochot, French politician.
Bertrand Lavier, French contemporary multimedia artist born in Châtillon-sur-Seine (Côte-d'Or) 14 June 1949. He lives and works in Paris and Aignay-le-Duc (Côte-d'Or).
The Baudus Family
Philippe Bertrand, a host on France Inter

See also
 Communes of the Côte-d'Or department

References

External links
 Aignay-le-Duc on the website of the National Geographic Institute 
Aignay-le-Duc on Géoportail, National Geographic Institute (IGN) website 
Aignay-le-Duc on the 1750 Cassini Map

Communes of Côte-d'Or